The Beatles were an English rock band formed in Liverpool in 1960. With a line-up comprising John Lennon, Paul McCartney, George Harrison and Ringo Starr, they are commonly regarded as the most influential band of all time. Between 1964 and 1970, they appeared in five major motion pictures, beginning with A Hard Day's Night (1964) and ending with Let It Be (1970). From late 1965 to 1969, the group also appeared in several promotional films for their singles, which have been credited with anticipating music videos and the rise of MTV in the 1980s.

During the years of Beatlemania, the Beatles appeared in two films, A Hard Day's Night (1964) and Help! (1965), both directed by American director Richard Lester. A Hard Day's Night was shot in black and white and featured the band as fictionalised versions of themselves during the height of Beatlemania, while Help! was shot in colour and saw the group struggle to record music while trying to protect Starr from a sinister cult and a pair of mad scientists, all of whom are obsessed with obtaining one of his rings. Following the recording of Sgt. Pepper's Lonely Hearts Club Band (1967), the Beatles produced and starred in their third major feature, Magical Mystery Tour (1967), a mostly unscripted television film which saw the group and friends on a British mystery tour. The band cameoed in the animated Yellow Submarine (1968), which featured cartoon versions of the band members and a soundtrack that included then-unreleased studio recordings. The band's final major film was Let It Be, which documented the group rehearsing and recording songs for the album of the same name.

Most of their films were very well-received, except Magical Mystery Tour which was panned by critics and the public alike. Each of their films had the same name as their associated soundtrack album and a song on that album. The individual Beatles also had their own film careers outside the band to varying degrees: Starr became a successful actor, Harrison became a successful producer with his production company HandMade Films, McCartney appeared in three films and Lennon had a co-starring role in How I Won the War (1967). The Beatles have also been the subject of numerous documentary films, have been portrayed onscreen in both film and television, and have inspired other films.

Films starring the Beatles

A Hard Day's Night

A Hard Day's Night was the Beatles' first major film. Shot in black and white, the film focused on fictionalised versions of the band during Beatlemania and the band's hectic touring lifestyle. It was directed by the up-and-coming American director Richard Lester, who was known for having directed a television version of the successful BBC radio series The Goon Show as well as the off-beat short film The Running, Jumping and Standing Still Film, with Peter Sellers and Spike Milligan. A Hard Day's Night is a mockumentary of the four members as they make their way to a London television programme. It created a lasting impression of their individual personas. Lennon became known as "the smart one", McCartney "the cute one", Harrison "the quiet one", and Starr "the lucky one". Starr's personality as the band's affable, self-deprecating drummer proved especially popular with fans and the press in the US. The film also starred Wilfrid Brambell as Paul's grandfather John McCartney, Norman Rossington as their manager Norm, and John Junkin as Shake, their road manager.

A Hard Day's Night was released in 1964 at the height of Beatlemania and was very well received by critics, and remains one of the most influential jukebox musicals. The film broke new ground in the field of British and American musical feature films, particularly in its abandoning of the genre's standard rags-to-riches premise for a comedic presentation of the artists playing themselves. Film historian Stephen Glynn describes it as "the canonical pop music film". He highlights the innovative techniques Lester uses in the sequence for "Can't Buy Me Love", as does Saul Austerlitz, who deems it the precursor to the modern music video.

Help!
Help! was the Beatles' second major film. Directed again by Richard Lester, it was the group's first film shot in colour. It starred the Beatles, Eleanor Bron, Leo McKern, Victor Spinetti and Roy Kinnear. In Help!, the Beatles struggle to record their new album while trying to protect Starr from a sinister eastern cult (a parody of the Thuggee cult) and a pair of mad scientists, all of whom are obsessed with obtaining a sacrificial ring that Starr secretly acquired through a fan letter by the victim. Like A Hard Day's Night, the group performs several songs in the film that appear on their soundtrack album of the same name. It was shot in exotic locations, including Salisbury Plain, with Stonehenge visible in the background, the Bahamas, Salzburg and the Austrian Alps.

With Help!, Lester presented the Beatles in "one of the central surrealist texts" of the 1960s, according to Bray. The film uses pop art visuals and satirises James Bond films, particularly the latter's depiction of the British Secret Service as an efficiently run organisation, and one enjoying a level of influence equal to its US counterpart in their shared operations. Released in 1965, Help! was greeted with positive reviews but was not as well-received as A Hard Day's Night; nevertheless, the film is retrospectively regarded as being very influential, including in the subsequent development of music videos. It is described by Glynn as "the colonial pop music film" for its conveying of the "clear racial undertones" and imperialism evident in Bond films from the period, and the clash that results with the Beatles' Swinging London personas. In addition to inspiring the Monkees' self-titled television show, the film influenced the 1960s Batman TV series.

Magical Mystery Tour

Magical Mystery Tour was the Beatles' third major film. Unlike the previous two, it was a television film and not a feature film, with a running time of less than an hour. The film follows a group of people on a British mystery tour in a 1967 coach, primarily focusing on Ringo Starr and his recently widowed Aunt Jessie (Jessie Robins). During the course of the tour, "strange things begin to happen" at the whim of "four or five magicians", four of whom are played by the Beatles themselves and the fifth by the band's long-time road manager Mal Evans. The film is interspersed with musical interludes, which include the Beatles performing "I Am the Walrus" and "The Fool on the Hill", Harrison singing "Blue Jay Way" while waiting on Blue Jay Way Road, and ending with the Beatles dressed in white dinner jackets, highlighting a glamorous old-style dance crowd scene, accompanied by the song "Your Mother Should Know".

The idea for the film was essentially McCartney's, which was thought up as he returned from a trip to the US in the late spring of 1967, and was loosely inspired by press coverage McCartney had read about Ken Kesey's Merry Pranksters' LSD-fueled American bus odyssey. McCartney felt inspired to take this idea and blend it with the peculiarly English working class tradition of charabanc mystery tours, in which children took chaperoned bus rides through the English countryside, destination unknown.

Magical Mystery Tour was broadcast in the UK on BBC1 on 26 December (Boxing Day), but in black and white rather than colour. It was the Beatles' first critical failure. As a result of the unfavourable reviews, networks in the US declined to show the film there. Beatles' management team member Peter Brown blamed McCartney for its failure. Brown said that during a private screening for management staff, the reaction had been "unanimous ... it was awful", yet McCartney was convinced that the film would be warmly received, and ignored Brown's advice to scrap the project and save the band from embarrassment.

Yellow Submarine
In 1968, United Artists released the animated musical fantasy film Yellow Submarine, which featured cartoon versions of the band members, voiced by actors. Other than a live-action cameo at the end of the film, the Beatles had little direct input in the film. Instead, the group contributed four previously unreleased songs that made their debut in the film. These included "All Together Now", "Hey Bulldog" and Harrison's "Only a Northern Song" and "It's All Too Much". It was acclaimed for its music, humour and innovative visual style. The Beatles are said to have been pleased with the result and attended its highly publicised London premiere.

The film's soundtrack album, released in early 1969, featured the four previously unreleased songs, two previously released songs: "Yellow Submarine" and "All You Need Is Love" and a re-recording of the film's orchestral soundtrack by producer George Martin. Numerous songs from the film were later remixed and released on the Yellow Submarine Songtrack in 1999. Yellow Submarine provided a revolution in animated film and allowed animators to fully express ideas using psychedelic visuals. It marked a departure from the confines of Disney's productions and was credited with saving the feature-length animated film.

Let It Be
Let It Be was the Beatles' final major feature film. Directed by Michael Lindsay-Hogg, it is a documentary film that documents the group rehearsing and recording songs for their twelfth and final studio album Let It Be. It was shot over a four-week period in January 1969, and includes an unannounced rooftop concert by the group, which was their last public performance. The documentary — originally intended to be a chronicle of the evolution of an album and the band's possible return to live performances — captured the prevailing tensions between the band members, which would ultimately lead to their break-up.

Let It Be observes the Beatles from a "fly on the wall" perspective, without narration, scene titles, or interviews with the main subjects. The first portion of the film shows the band rehearsing on a sound stage at Twickenham Film Studios. The songs are works in progress, with a heated exchange between McCartney and Harrison while recording "Two of Us" shown. Also present are Mal Evans and Yoko Ono, who's at Lennon's side at all times. The group is then shown arriving individually at Apple headquarters, where they record several songs, some complete and some works-in-progress. Complete performances of "Two of Us", "Let It Be", and "The Long and Winding Road" are also shown. The film's final portion shows the Beatles and Billy Preston giving an unannounced concert from the headquarters rooftop. They perform "Get Back", "Don't Let Me Down", "I've Got a Feeling", "One After 909" and "Dig a Pony", intercut with reactions and comments from surprised Londoners gathering on the streets below, before being shut down by the police.

The band initially rejected both the film and the album, instead recording and issuing the Abbey Road album. But with a large investment spent on the project, it was decided to finish and release the film and album (the latter with considerable post-production by Phil Spector) in the spring of 1970. When the film released in May 1970, it was after the group's breakup was announced, which gave the film's depiction of the band's acrimony and attempts to recapture the group's spirit a significant poignancy.

Individual projects
In late 1966, following the Beatles' cease in touring and before the recording sessions for Sgt. Pepper's Lonely Hearts Club Band, Lennon took time off to play a supporting character, Gripweed, in Richard Lester's How I Won the War. A satire of World War II films, the film's dry, ironic British humour was not well received by American audiences. Lennon would later produce avant-garde films with his second wife Yoko Ono, such as Rape which was produced for the Austrian television network ORF.

In addition to his roles in the Beatles' films, Starr has received praise from critics and film industry professionals regarding his acting; director and producer Walter Shenson called him "a superb actor, an absolute natural". By the mid-1960s, Starr had become a connoisseur of film. Starr has acted in Candy (1968), The Magic Christian (1969), Blindman (1971), Son of Dracula (1974) and Caveman (1981). In 1971, he starred as Larry the Dwarf in Frank Zappa's 200 Motels and was featured in Harry Nilsson's animated film The Point! He then co-starred in That'll Be the Day (1973) as a Teddy Boy and appeared in The Last Waltz, the Martin Scorsese documentary film about the 1976 farewell concert of the Band. Starr played the Pope in Ken Russell's Lisztomania (1975), and later appeared as himself and a downtrodden alter-ego Ognir Rrats in Ringo (1978), an American-made television comedy film based loosely on The Prince and the Pauper. For the 1979 documentary film on the Who, The Kids Are Alright, Starr appeared in interview segments with fellow drummer Keith Moon.

Harrison achieved success as a film producer. He helped finance Ravi Shankar's documentary Raga and released it through Apple Films in 1971. He also produced, with Apple manager Allen Klein, the Concert for Bangladesh film. In 1973, he produced the feature film Little Malcolm, but the project was lost amid the litigation surrounding the former Beatles ending their business ties with Klein. In 1978, in an effort to produce Monty Python's Life of Brian, he and Denis O'Brien formed the production company HandMade Films. Harrison financed the production of Life of Brian in part by mortgaging his home, which Eric Idle later called "the most anybody's ever paid for a cinema ticket in history". Harrison would later produce Time Bandits (1981), which featured a new song by Harrison, "Dream Away"; Mona Lisa (1986); Shanghai Surprise (1986); Withnail and I (1987) and made cameo appearances in several of these films, including as a reporter in All You Need Is Cash and as a nightclub singer in Shanghai Surprise, for which he recorded five new songs.

McCartney appeared in a cameo role in Peter Richardson's 1987 film Eat the Rich and released his own film Give My Regards to Broad Street in 1984 in which Starr co-starred as a fictionalised version of himself. He also appeared in the 2017 film Pirates of the Caribbean: Dead Men Tell No Tales, as a character named Uncle Jack.

Unmade films 
During the 1960s, there were many ideas pitched for films, but these were either rejected or never saw the light of day; such projects included A Talent for Loving, a Western film written by Richard Condon; Shades of a Personality; film versions of The Lord of the Rings and The Three Musketeers starring the group (Richard Lester, who directed the group's first two films, went on to direct The Three Musketeers without the Beatles' involvement); and a script by playwright Joe Orton called Up Against It. Robert Zemeckis was planning a remake of the film Yellow Submarine with motion capture technology but it was cancelled in 2011.

Critical reception 

A: Ratings for the 2000 re-release.

Promotional films

Starting with "Day Tripper" and "We Can Work It Out" in late 1965, the band filmed promotional clips for their singles to circumvent the industry norm of having to make numerous personal appearances on television shows. They continued to make promotional clips for their non-album singles until 1969, the final being Harrison's "Something". The Beatles' promotional clips anticipated the music video and the rise of MTV in the 1980s. All of their promotional films were remastered and released on 1+ in 2015.

Documentaries
The Beatles have been the subject of a number of documentary films.

Fictionalised Beatles
The Beatles (and the individual members) have been portrayed onscreen numerous times, through film and television. Below is a list of films and television programmes that have portrayed the Beatles.

Inspired by the Beatles
Several fictional films not depicting the Beatles have been entirely based on Beatles themes and songs:

Other
 The vultures in the 1967 animated film The Jungle Book are considered caricatures of the Beatles. The Beatles were originally planned to voice them, but later declined due to scheduling conflicts.

References 
Citations

Sources

 
 
 
 
 
 
 
 
 
 
 
 
 
 
 
 
 
 
 
 
 
 
 
 
 
 
 
 
 

 

 
 
 
 
 
 
 
 
 
 
 

 
Musical group filmographies